Brattvåg Idrettslag is a Norwegian sports club from the village of Brattvåg in the municipality of Ålesund in Møre og Romsdal county, Norway. It has sections for association football and Nordic skiing. The club was established in 1940.

The men's football team currently plays in the 2. divisjon, the third tier of the Norwegian football league system. The team was promoted from the 3. divisjon in 2017 and played last in the 2. divisjon in 1996 and 2016. Their current head coach is Rene Skovdahl. The women's football team plays in the 3. divisjon.

Current squad 
Updated 17 May 2022

Recent history 
{|class="wikitable"
|-bgcolor="#efefef"
! Season
! 
! 
! 
! 
! 
! 
! 
! 
! 
!Cup
!Notes
|-
|2010 
|3. divisjon
|align=right |5
|align=right|22||align=right|9||align=right|4||align=right|9
|align=right|46||align=right|46||align=right|31
||First qualifying round
|
|-
|2011 
|3. divisjon
|align=right |10
|align=right|26||align=right|10||align=right|3||align=right|13
|align=right|47||align=right|66||align=right|33
||First qualifying round
|
|-
|2012 
|3. divisjon
|align=right|3
|align=right|26||align=right|14||align=right|6||align=right|6
|align=right|65||align=right|41||align=right|48
||First qualifying round
|
|-
|2013
|3. divisjon
|align=right |2
|align=right|26||align=right|15||align=right|4||align=right|7
|align=right|68||align=right|34||align=right|49
||First round
|
|-
|2014 
|3. divisjon
|align=right |2
|align=right|26||align=right|17||align=right|4||align=right|5
|align=right|88||align=right|35||align=right|55
||First round
|
|-
|2015 
|3. divisjon
|align=right bgcolor=#DDFFDD| 1
|align=right|26||align=right|20||align=right|4||align=right|2
|align=right|67||align=right|21||align=right|64
||First round
|Promoted
|-
|2016 
|2. divisjon
|align=right bgcolor="#FFCCCC"| 9
|align=right|26||align=right|11||align=right|5||align=right|10
|align=right|41||align=right|37||align=right|38
||Fourth round
|Relegated
|-
|2017 
|3. divisjon
|align=right bgcolor=#DDFFDD| 1
|align=right|26||align=right|17||align=right|5||align=right|4
|align=right|78||align=right|27||align=right|56
||First round
|Promoted
|-
|2018 
|2. divisjon
|align=right| 8
|align=right|26||align=right|11||align=right|2||align=right|13
|align=right|37||align=right|51||align=right|35
||Third round
|
|-
|2019
|2. divisjon
|align=right| 9
|align=right|26||align=right|9||align=right|6||align=right|11
|align=right|43||align=right|50||align=right|33
||Second round
|
|-
|2020
|2. divisjon
|align=right| 6
|align=right|13||align=right|5||align=right|4||align=right|4
|align=right|26||align=right|17||align=right|19
||Cancelled
|
|-
|2021
|2. divisjon
|align=right| 5
|align=right|26||align=right|12||align=right|5||align=right|9
|align=right|55||align=right|48||align=right|41
||Second round
|
|-
|2022
|2. divisjon
|align=right| 9
|align=right|26||align=right|10||align=right|3||align=right|13
|align=right|47||align=right|52||align=right|33
||Second round
|
|}
Source:

References

External links
 Official site 
 Brattvåg Idrettslag results

Football clubs in Norway
Sport in Møre og Romsdal
Association football clubs established in 1940
Sport in Ålesund
1940 establishments in Norway